Harry George Duke (born 6 September 2001) is an English cricketer. He made his first-class debut on 14 May 2021, for Yorkshire in the 2021 County Championship. Prior to his first-class debut, he was named in England's squad for the 2020 Under-19 Cricket World Cup. He made his Twenty20 debut on 2 July 2021, for Yorkshire in the 2021 T20 Blast. He made his List A debut on 22 July 2021, for Yorkshire in the 2021 Royal London One-Day Cup.

References

External links
 

2001 births
Living people
Cricketers from Wakefield
English cricketers
Yorkshire cricketers